Deyarmonville is an unincorporated community in Jefferson County, in the U.S. state of Ohio.

Deyarmonville once had a one-room schoolhouse.

References

Unincorporated communities in Jefferson County, Ohio
Unincorporated communities in Ohio